The Law of the North is a 1917 American silent adventure film directed by Burton George and Edward H. Griffith and starring Shirley Mason, Pat O'Malley and Richard Tucker.

Cast
 Shirley Mason as Edith Graham
 Pat O'Malley as Cpl. John Emerson
 Richard Tucker as The Rt. Hon. Reginald Annesley
 Charles Sutton as Lt. Robert Graham
 Sally Crute as Marie Beaubin
 Fred Jones as Pierre Beaubin
 Robert Kegerreis as Ba'Tiste

References

Bibliography
 Brégent-Heald, Dominique. Borderland Films: American Cinema, Mexico, and Canada During the Progressive Era. University of Nebraska Press, 2015.

External links
 

1917 films
1917 adventure films
1910s English-language films
American silent feature films
American adventure films
American black-and-white films
Films directed by Edward H. Griffith
Films directed by Burton George
Edison Studios films
1910s American films
Silent adventure films